The Meiji Griffins football program, established in 1934, represents Meiji University in college football. Nihon is a member of the Kantoh Collegiate American Football Association.

External links
 

American football teams established in 1934
American football in Japan
1934 establishments in Japan